Alpha Beta Kappa is the only honor society recognizing excellence in the arts, the sciences, the trades, business, and both technical and general studies. It is also the only honor society in America that represents degree-granting institutions, junior colleges, senior colleges, and student-centered private career schools.

Alpha Beta Kappa places Chapters in nationally accredited institutions which have demonstrated high standards for many years in the education and training of women and men in the numerous fields, trades and occupations essential to modern society. It is the mark of distinction for an institution to be awarded a Chapter of Alpha Beta Kappa. The purpose of the Society is to encourage and recognize superior student academic achievement, character and leadership.

Symbols and traditions

Letters
Alpha: The first letter of the Greek alphabet, stands for Athena, the Goddess of Wisdom and patroness of the arts, crafts, and sciences. She bespeaks the spirit of truth and is armed with a spear of lightning. Alpha also means the first of anything and it is the name of the brightest star in a constellation.
Beta: The second Greek letter, represents Brasidas, a distinguished Spartan General who fought with courage and gave his life in the fourth century B.C. He planned, organized and followed through in his cause. His life reminds us of our opportunity and duty to "fight the good fight."
Kappa: The tenth Greek letter, stands for Kudos, meaning glory, credit and praise. Accordingly, A.B.K. means recognition and praise for those who have worked valiantly and successfully in one or more fields of the applied arts and sciences.

Other symbols
The Star: The Star represents our ideals and dreams. The five points stand for the broad fields of Trade, Technology, Science, Industry, and General Studies. Those who labor and achieve in these fields do not oppose, rather they support and advance the liberal arts. Alpha Beta Kappa believes in the pursuit of truth and excellence in all fields and hopes to recognize institutions and individuals who have achieved and who hold forth the promise of future growth and service, especially in the areas represented by our star.
The Laurel Branches: The laurel branches indicate honor and distinction. Since the days of ancient Greece, laurel has been the badge of successful achievement. The laurel tree is evergreen and its leaves are aromatic.
The Official Flower and Colors: The official flower of the fraternity is the red carnation and the colors of the order are red and blue.

Motto
The Latin Motto of Alpha Beta Kappa is "Faciemus," meaning "We shall build." Accordingly, members of the fraternity are lifelong builders. They will ever strive to help others, their Alma Mater, and the society wherein they are leaders.

References

Honor societies